William Lunn may refer to:

William Lunn (politician) (1872–1942), English Labour Party politician
William Lunn (educator) (1796–1886), Canadian educator, businessman, and politician
William Lunn (rugby union) (1926–1996), New Zealand rugby union player
William Lunn (freestyle skier) (fl. 2010s) in FIS Freestyle World Ski Championships 2011 – Men's ski cross
William Lunn (priest) (died 1747), Archdeacon of Huntingdon and Wisbech

See also
Billy Lunn (disambiguation)